The Cuatro Ciénegas softshell (Apalone spinifera atra), also called the  black spiny softshell, is a subspecies of the spiny softshell turtle in the family Trionychidae. The subspecies, along with its parent species, was formerly classified in the genus Trionyx.

Geographic range
A. s. atra is found only in the Cuatro Ciénegas Basin in the state of Coahuila, Mexico.

Conservation status
As of the last assessment in 1996, A. s. atra was considered "Critically Endangered" by the "IUCN Red List of Threatened Species".

References

Bibliography
 
 
Webb RG, Legler JM (1960). "A New Softshell Turtle (Genus Trionyx) from Coahuila, Mexico". Univ. Kansas Sci. Bull. 40 (2): 21–30. (Trionyx ater, new species).

External links

 2006 IUCN Red List of Threatened Species. iucnredlist.org  Retrieved 9 July 2007.
 Biodiversity.mongabay.com

Apalone
Endemic reptiles of Mexico
Turtles of North America
Cuatrociénegas Municipality
Natural history of Coahuila
Critically endangered biota of Mexico
Critically endangered fauna of North America
Reptiles described in 1960
Taxa named by Robert G. Webb
Taxonomy articles created by Polbot